= Tunnel cluster =

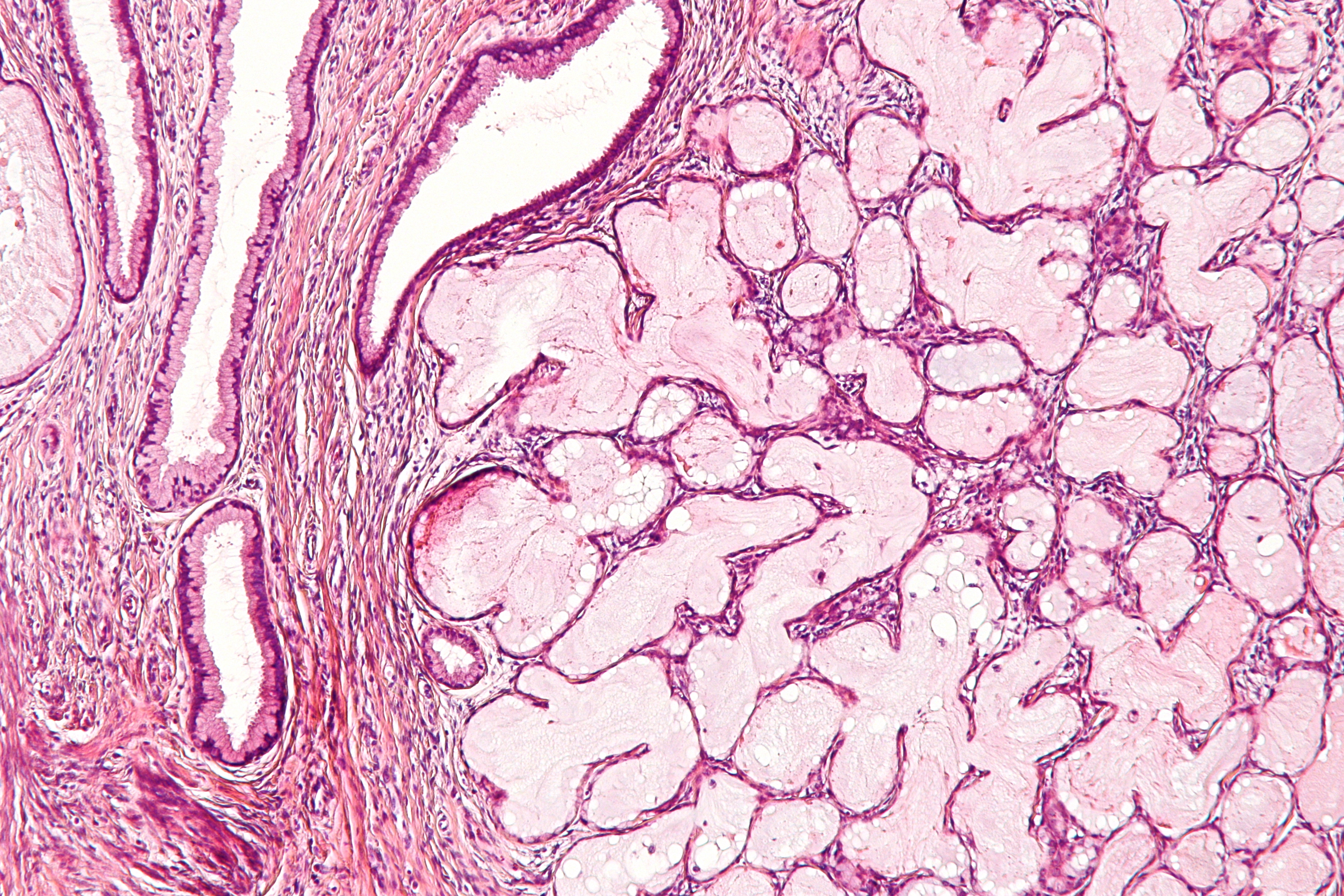
Micrograph of a tunnel cluster. H&E stain.

A tunnel cluster, more formally tunnel cluster of the cervix and cervical tunnel cluster, is a benign group of dilated endocervical glands in the cervix.

It is significant only in that it can be confused for a malignancy, i.e. cancer.

== See also ==
- Cervical cancer
